Tremadoc may refer to:

 Tremadog, a village in northern Wales (of which "Tremadoc" is an alternate, anglicised name).
 The Tremadocian, the first internationally recognized stage of the Ordovician Period of the Paleozoic Era.